Lucas Heights is a suburb in southern Sydney, in the state of New South Wales, Australia. It is near to the Royal National Park.

Geography
It is located 31 kilometres south-west of the Sydney central business district, in the local government area of the Sutherland Shire. Lucas Heights is located on the Woronora River, which flows north into the Georges River.

Unusually for a suburb, Lucas Heights does not contain a residential area. The residential area previously part of Lucas Heights was renamed Barden Ridge in 1996 to increase the real estate value of the area, as it would no longer be instantly associated with the High Flux Australian Reactor (HIFAR).

History
Lucas Heights was named after John Lucas Senior, a flour miller who in 1823 was granted  on the 'head of unnamed stream into Georges River'. He built a water-driven mill for grinding corn from the Illawarra farms. Small ships sailed up the coast into Botany Bay, Georges River and the Woronora River.

Commercial areas
Lucas Heights has become arguably most notable as the site of the Australian Nuclear Science and Technology Organisation (ANSTO) research establishment originally created by the Australian Atomic Energy Commission and home to the historic HIFAR research nuclear reactor.

HIFAR was shut down in January 2007 and replaced by the OPAL research reactor. OPAL bears leading neutron radiation facilities and attracts international scientists as staff members and many hundreds of user groups. In 2005, Australian police suggested the HIFAR reactor was a possible target for a foiled terrorist bomb attack. The area is also on Google Maps, which has caused some concerns regarding its security. Spent fuel from the OPAL reactor is transported to Port Kembla, then exported to France for reprocessing.

The Australian Institute of Nuclear Science and Engineering (AINSE) also has its headquarters at Lucas Heights.

Lucas Heights also hosts a (non-nuclear) waste-management facility, which was for many years a major disposal site for sanitary carters. Some of the full landfills on this site are presently being sequentially redeveloped into a sporting complex containing playing fields for soccer, netball, rugby league and the home of the award-winning "The Ridge" golf driving-range.

Climate
Due to its elevation, Lucas Heights is one of the few places in Sydney that has a borderline Oceanic (Cfb) and a Humid subtropical climate (Cfa).

References 

 
Suburbs of Sydney